Ken Bennett (born 14 February 1940) is a former Australian rules footballer who played for Collingwood in the VFL during the late 1950s and early 1960s.

Bennett, originally from Dandenong, was just 17 years old when he debuted midway through the 1957 season. Although primarily a wingman he was also used up forward and was a member of Collingwood's 1958 VFL Grand Final premiership team. Bennett kicked two goals and featured in their best players in Collingwood's 1958 premiership.

Bennett (Albury) won the 1963 Ovens & Murray Football League best and fairest award, the Morris Medal, with 17 votes, from John Perry (Wodonga) and Graeme Leydin (Wangaratta Rovers), both on 16 votes. Ken was also captain - coach of Albury in 1963 too, prior to Murray Weideman taking on the role.

References

Holmesby, Russell and Main, Jim (2007). The Encyclopedia of AFL Footballers. 7th ed. Melbourne: Bas Publishing.

1940 births
Living people
Australian rules footballers from Victoria (Australia)
Collingwood Football Club players
Collingwood Football Club Premiership players
One-time VFL/AFL Premiership players